Black Planet may refer to:
BlackPlanet, a social networking website geared towards African-Americans
Black Planet, a song by The Sisters of Mercy
a Carbon planet, a proposed planetary type that is actually black.
A band that is mentioned in Hunter X Hunter.
The Black Planet, science fiction film